Jack was a popular Italian-language technology magazine which was published in Italy from October 2000 to January 2012 by Arnoldo Mondadori Editore in a joint venture with the German publisher Gruner + Jahr. It was one of the most popular technology magazines in Italy.

In 2007 the circulation of Jack was 129,729 copies.

See also
List of magazines published in Italy

References

External links
 Official site 
 Jack on Gruner + Jahr Corporate Site

2000 establishments in Italy
2012 disestablishments in Italy
Jack
Jack
Jack
Jack
Magazines published in Milan
Jack
Jack
Arnoldo Mondadori Editore